The  is an archaeological site in the city of Hachinohe, Aomori Prefecture, in the Tōhoku region of northern Japan containing the ruins of a middle to late Jōmon period (3000-1000 BC) settlement.  The remains were designated a National Historic Site in 1957 by the Japanese government.   It is also referred to as the "Korekawa Stone Age site", although the remains discovered are from the Jōmon period, rather than the Japanese Paleolithic period.

Overview
The location is on a river terrace on the left bank of the Niida River, at an altitude of approximately 10 to 30 meters. The area was first excavated in the 1920s, and then much more extensively in 1962 and again from 1999 to 2004.

The size of the settlement during the middle to late Jōmon period (3000-1000 BC) was relatively small, but the site included the residential area, graveyard, work area, garbage midden and ritual place.

The garbage midden contained the remnants of various shellfish, bones of animals and fish and an extremely large number of Japanese horse chestnuts and walnuts, indicating the importance of these nuts in the Jōmon period diet. Of especial note were lacquerware items, both of decoration and for strengthening and preserving tools, which suggest systematic lacquer tool production activities.

The Nakai Site is also one of the type sites representing the Kamegaoka culture of the final phase of the Jōmon period (1000-300 BC).

In 2011, 330 items recovered from the site were designated as Important Cultural Properties by the Japanese government. One of the objects, a clay figurine depicting a seated man in a pose of prayer, has been designated a National Treasure of Japan.

The site has been submitted for inscription on the UNESCO World Heritage List as one of the Jōmon Archaeological Sites in Hokkaidō, Northern Tōhoku, and other regions

See also

List of Historic Sites of Japan (Aomori)
Jōmon Archaeological Sites in Hokkaidō, Northern Tōhoku, and other regions

References

External links
Korekawa Jomon-kan
Aomori Prefecture Tourism Guide
Hachinohe city home page

Archaeological sites in Japan
Tourist attractions in Aomori Prefecture
Jōmon period
Hachinohe
History of Aomori Prefecture
Museums in Aomori Prefecture